Northeast Iowa Regional Airport  is a public airport located three miles (5 km) east of the central business district of Charles City, in Floyd County, Iowa, United States. It is owned by the North Cedar Aviation Authority and was formerly known as Charles City Municipal Airport.

Facilities and aircraft 
It also has two turf runways: 4/22 measuring 2,536 x 160 ft (773 x 49 m) and 17/35 measuring 1,780 x 170 ft (543 x 52 m).

For the 12-month period ending August 14, 2007, the airport had 5,250 aircraft operations, an average of 14 per day: 87% general aviation and 13% air taxi. At that time there were 24 aircraft based at this airport: 88% single-engine and 13% multi-engine.

References

External links 
 

Airports in Iowa
Transportation buildings and structures in Floyd County, Iowa